Azartash Azarnoush (18 February 1938 – 7 October 2021) was a linguist and scholar of Iran. Born in Qom, he held two Ph.D. degrees from France. He specialized in Arabic literature. Azarnoush was part of Imam Sadeq University and Tarbiat Modarres University faculty, and was the director of the Arabic department of The Center for the Great Islamic Encyclopedia in Tehran since 1986, and published over 200 articles in the field of Arabic literature, as well as a few dozen books.

Selected publications
"A guide to the influence of Persian language in Arabic language" (کتاب راهنمای نفوذ فارسی در فرهنگ و زبان تازی)
"A history of Arabic language and culture" (تاریخ زبان و فرهنگ عربی)
"A contemporary dictionary of Arabic to Persian" (فرهنگ معاصر عربی به فارسی), which won a Best book award in Iran in 1999.
Elements de religions iraniens chez les Arabes à l'époque préislamique, 1976.

References

External links
Biography in Persian

1938 births
2021 deaths
Iranian Iranologists
Academic staff of Imam Sadiq University
Linguists from Iran
Iranian literary critics
20th-century Iranian historians
Arabists
People from Qom
Academic staff of Tarbiat Modares University
Iranian Science and Culture Hall of Fame recipients in Literature and Culture
Iran's Book of the Year Awards recipients